Yamamuro (written: 山室) is a Japanese surname. Notable people with the surname include:

, Japanese gymnast
, Japanese baseball player

Japanese-language surnames